Morimospasma paradoxum is a species of beetle in the family Cerambycidae. It was described by Ganglbauer in 1890.

References

Phrissomini
Beetles described in 1890